Irreligion in the Philippines is not particularly well understood.  It is difficult to quantify the number of atheists or agnostics in the Philippines as they are not officially counted in the census of the country, although the National Statistics Office (NSO) in 2010 gathered that 73,252 Filipinos have no religious affiliation or have answered "none". Since 2011, the non-religious increasingly organized themselves, especially among the youth in the country. There is a stigma attached to being an atheist in the Philippines, and this necessitates many Filipino atheists to communicate with each other via the Internet, for example via the Philippine Atheism, Agnosticism and Secularism, Inc. formerly known as Philippine Atheists and Agnostics Society.

Growth
The number of atheists has risen consistently since the 1990s, as has the number of people considering it, church attendance, and overall religiously. One in eleven Filipino Catholics consider leaving the Church, only 37% attend church every week, and only 29% consider themselves strongly religious. Overall, anti Catholic sentiment is a growing trend in the Philippines, and even former president Duterte takes part in bashing the Church for its sex scandals and corruption. 

According to both Catholics and Atheists, belief in the Catholic Church is linked to poverty more than it is religious conviction, many go to Church out of desperation and need for hope, and some atheists, such as Miss. M, founder of HAPI, believe that starting secular outreach institutions will help Filipinos shed reliance on the Church and put their future in their own hands.

Persecution and discrimination
Filipino atheists are often harassed for their disbelief, and according to one atheist it's "how Filipinos think. They view atheists as Satanists".

Organizations
Humanist Alliance Philippines, International
Philippine Atheism, Agnosticism, and Secularism Inc.
Filipino Freethinkers

Prominent figures
Red Tani
Marissa Torres Langseth

Philippine religious distribution
According to the 2000 census, the religious distribution of the country's population was as follows:

See also
Hinduism in the Philippines
Buddhism in the Philippines

References

Philippines
Religion in the Philippines